Todd Lehmann is an American former basketball player. He played for Drexel University for four years. In 1990, as a senior, he led the nation with 9.29 assists per game. His 260 total assists that season was a school record.

Lehmann was raised in Riverside Township, New Jersey and played high school basketball at Holy Cross, where he and his sister both scored the 1,000th point of their career on the same night.

Lehmann was later an assistant coach for Rowan University for two seasons. In 2007, he was inducted into the Drexel Athletics Hall of Fame.

His father, George, played in the NBA and ABA for seven years.

See also
List of NCAA Division I men's basketball season assists leaders

References

External links
 Todd's Hall of Fame profile at Drexel University

Living people
Basketball coaches from New Jersey
Basketball players from New Jersey
Drexel Dragons men's basketball players
High school basketball coaches in the United States
Holy Cross Academy (New Jersey) alumni
People from Riverside Township, New Jersey
Point guards
Rowan Profs men's basketball coaches
Year of birth missing (living people)
Place of birth missing (living people)
Sportspeople from Burlington County, New Jersey
American men's basketball players